Balistes polylepis, or finescale triggerfish, is a species of fish found in the Pacific Coast of the Americas from San Francisco southwards to Callao, Peru and the Galapagos.

References

External links
 
 
 

polylepis
Fauna of the Western United States
Fauna of the San Francisco Bay Area